Tobias Okiki Lawal (born 7 June 2000) is an Austrian professional footballer who plays for LASK in the Bundesliga as a goalkeeper.

Club career
Lawal started his career with ASKÖ Donau Linz. In 2013, he transferred to LASK Juniors. In 2014, he joined AKA Linz, where he played till 2018 before returning to LASK Juniors.

In June 2017, he made his debut for LASK Juniors against USV Allerheiligen, in September that same year, he joined FC Wels on loan and made his debut in the Regionalliga against SV Ried Amateure on Matchday 8. During the winter break of that season, he rejoined LASK Juniors.

Lawal was part of the LASK Juniors OÖ team that got promoted to the Second League in 2018 where he made his first professional league debut against Wacker Innsbruck II on the first matchday of that season. He was promoted to the senior LASK team in 2020 and made his debut in the  Bundesliga, in a 3–0 defeat to Rapid Vienna.

International career
Lawal was born in Austria to a Nigerian father and an Austrian mother. Lawal made his debut for the Austria U19 team in September 2018 in a friendly versus Denmark. In June 2019, he played for the U20 team in a match against Switzerland. In September 2020, he was called up by Gernot Rohr for Nigeria for the friendly matches against Algeria and Tunisia.

References

External links
 
 
 Tobias Lawal at the ÖFB website

2000 births
Living people
Footballers from Linz
Austrian footballers
Association football goalkeepers
Austria youth international footballers
Austrian people of Nigerian descent
LASK players
Austrian Football Bundesliga players
FC Wels players